Émile Boitelle (7 August 1888 – 22 October 1951) was a French gymnast who competed in the 1920 Summer Olympics. He was part of the French team, which won the bronze medal in the gymnastics men's team, European system event in 1920.

References

External links
 

1898 births
1951 deaths
French male artistic gymnasts
Gymnasts at the 1920 Summer Olympics
Olympic gymnasts of France
Olympic bronze medalists for France
Olympic medalists in gymnastics
Medalists at the 1920 Summer Olympics
20th-century French people